The 2011 Valencian regional election was held on Sunday, 22 May 2011, to elect the 8th Corts of the Valencian Community. All 99 seats in the Corts were up for election. The election was held simultaneously with regional elections in twelve other autonomous communities and local elections all throughout Spain.

The election was won by the People's Party (PP), which increased its majority despite a drop in its vote share. The Socialist Party of the Valencian Country (PSPV–PSOE) continued its long term decline and, similarly to the PSOE's performance in other regions with concurrent elections, it sustained severed damage from voters—weary of the ongoing financial crisis affecting the country—and obtained one of its worst electoral results since the autonomous community's inception. On the other hand, the electoral alliance between United Left of the Valencian Country (EUPV) and the Valencian Nationalist Bloc (Bloc) which contested the 2007 election had dissolved, with both parties entering the legislature much at the expense of the declining PSOE. The Bloc, running together with Valencian People's Initiative (IdPV) and The Greens–Ecologist Left of the Valencian Country (EV–EE) under the Coalició Compromís umbrella, entered parliament on its own for the first time in history.

As a result of the election, Francisco Camps was re-elected president for a third term in office in June 2011. However, his alleged implication in the Gürtel corruption scandal would see his resigned just one months into his term in July, being succeeded by Alberto Fabra, who would remain in the post for the remainder of the legislature.

Overview

Electoral system
The Corts Valencianes were the devolved, unicameral legislature of the Valencian autonomous community, having legislative power in regional matters as defined by the Spanish Constitution and the Valencian Statute of Autonomy, as well as the ability to vote confidence in or withdraw it from a regional president.

Voting for the Corts was on the basis of universal suffrage, which comprised all nationals over 18 years of age, registered in the Valencian Community and in full enjoyment of their political rights. Amendments to the electoral law in 2011 required for Valencians abroad to apply for voting before being permitted to vote, a system known as "begged" or expat vote. The 99 members of the Corts Valencianes were elected using the D'Hondt method and a closed list proportional representation, with a threshold of five percent of valid votes—which included blank ballots—being applied regionally. Parties not reaching the threshold were not taken into consideration for seat distribution. Seats were allocated to constituencies, corresponding to the provinces of Alicante, Castellón and Valencia, with each being allocated an initial minimum of 20 seats and the remaining 39 being distributed in proportion to their populations (provided that the seat-to-population ratio in any given province did not exceed three times that of any other).

Election date
After legal amendments in 2006 taking effect after the 2007 election, fixed-term mandates were abolished, instead allowing the term of the Corts Valencianes to expire after an early dissolution. The election decree was required to be issued no later than the twenty-fifth day prior to the date of expiry of parliament and published on the following day in the Official Journal of the Valencian Government (DOGV), with election day taking place on the fifty-fourth day from publication. The previous election was held on 27 May 2007, which meant that the legislature's term would have expired on 27 May 2011. The election Decree was required to be published no later than 3 May 2011, with the election taking place on the fifty-fourth day from publication, setting the latest possible election date for the Corts on Sunday, 26 June 2011.

The president had the prerogative to dissolve the Corts Valencianes and call a snap election, provided that no motion of no confidence was in process. In the event of an investiture process failing to elect a regional president within a two-month period from the first ballot, the Corts were to be automatically dissolved and a fresh election called.

Parties and candidates
The electoral law allowed for parties and federations registered in the interior ministry, coalitions and groupings of electors to present lists of candidates. Parties and federations intending to form a coalition ahead of an election were required to inform the relevant Electoral Commission within ten days of the election call, whereas groupings of electors needed to secure the signature of at least one percent of the electorate in the constituencies for which they sought election, disallowing electors from signing for more than one list of candidates.

Below is a list of the main parties and electoral alliances which contested the election:

Opinion polls
The table below lists voting intention estimates in reverse chronological order, showing the most recent first and using the dates when the survey fieldwork was done, as opposed to the date of publication. Where the fieldwork dates are unknown, the date of publication is given instead. The highest percentage figure in each polling survey is displayed with its background shaded in the leading party's colour. If a tie ensues, this is applied to the figures with the highest percentages. The "Lead" column on the right shows the percentage-point difference between the parties with the highest percentages in a poll. When available, seat projections determined by the polling organisations are displayed below (or in place of) the percentages in a smaller font; 50 seats were required for an absolute majority in the Corts Valencianes.

Results

Overall

Distribution by constituency

Aftermath

Government formation

July 2011 investiture

Notes

References
Opinion poll sources

Other

2011 in the Valencian Community
Valencian Community
Regional elections in the Valencian Community
May 2011 events in Europe